Anthem of His Majesty the Tsar or God Save the Tsar was the royal anthem of the Kingdom of Bulgaria from 1908 to 1944. The original music was written by Emil von Sauer. Later the composition by Emanuil Manolov was adopted, and the lyrics were written by Major General Georgi Agura. During this period, the national anthem of the Kingdom of Bulgaria was Shumi Maritsa and the "Anthem of His Majesty the Tsar" was played immediately after it on every solemn occasion in the Tsar's presence.

Lyrics

References

External links 
 Anthem of His Majesty the Tsar on the official website of Bulgarian royal family
 Instrumental version in mp3 format

European anthems
Royal anthems